"Faces" is a song by the English singer-songwriter Nik Kershaw. It appears as the eighth track on Kershaw's highly successful debut album Human Racing, released in 1984.

Lyrically, the song seems to be about drugs or even religion. When Kershaw was asked about the meaning of the song, he said: "I can't remember... but seriously, it's very difficult going back on old songs and trying to remember what you were thinking about when you wrote them... but I seem to remember [that] it was about religion and the hypocrisy of some organised religions."

References

External links

1984 songs
Nik Kershaw songs
Songs written by Nik Kershaw
Song recordings produced by Peter Collins (record producer)